Carli is a surname, and may refer to:

People 
 Adelir Antonio de Carli (1966–2008), Brazilian Catholic priest
 Antonio Francesco Carli (fl. 1706–23), Italian bass singer, primarily of operatic roles
 Arnaldo Carli (1901–1972), Italian racing cyclist and Olympic champion in track cycling
 Auguste Carli (1868–1930), French sculptor
 Bernardo Ribas Carli (1986–2018), Brazilian politician and member of the Brazilian Social Democracy Party
 Carlo Carli (Australian politician) (born 1960), Labor Party member of the Victorian Legislative Assembly from 1994 to 2010
 Carlo Carli (Italian politician) (born 1945), long-time member of the Italian Socialist Party
 Carla Carli Mazzucato (born 1935), Italian artist
 Dena M. Carli, former Democratic member of the Illinois House of Representatives
 Didi Carli, Argentinian ballet dancer
 Diletta Carli (born 1996), Italian swimmer
 Dionigi da Palacenza Carli, Italian missionary in Africa
 Filippo Carli (1876–1938), Italian fascist sociologist
 Ph. G. "Flip" Carli (1879–1972), Indonesian footballer turned film director 
 François Carli (1872-1957), French sculptor
 Giampiero de Carli (born 1970), former Italian rugby union player and current coach
 Gian Rinaldo Carli (1720–1795), OItalian economist, historian, and antiquarian
 Guido Carli (1914–1993), Italian banker, economist and politician
 Joel Carli (born 1986), Argentine footballer
 Laura Carli (1906–2005), Italian actress and dubber
 Marco di Carli (born 1985), German swimmer
 Mario Carli (1888–1935), Italian poet, novelist, essayist, diplomat, and journalist
 Patricia Carli (born 1938), Italian-French singer
 Robert Carli (born 1970), Canadian film and television composer and saxophonist

See also

Cari (name)
Carle, surnames
Carle (given name)
Carlie
Carlo (name)
Italian-language surnames
Surnames of South Tyrolean origin